Michaela Herweck (born 1 September 1947) is a German diver. She competed in the women's 3 metre springboard event at the 1972 Summer Olympics.

References

1947 births
Living people
German female divers
Olympic divers of West Germany
Divers at the 1972 Summer Olympics
Divers from Dresden
20th-century German women